Senator Staples may refer to:

Abram Penn Staples (1885–1951), Virginia State Senate
Danny Staples (politician) (1932–2002), Missouri State Senate
Emily Anne Staples (1929–2018), Minnesota State Senate
Todd Staples (born 1963), Texas State Senate